Helix QAC, formerly QA·C  is a commercial static code analysis software tool produced by Minneapolis, Minnesota-based software vendor Perforce Software.QAC means Quality Assurance and Control.  The software was originally developed in 1986 by UK-based Programming Research Limited (PRQA) for the C language.  Perforce acquired PRQA in May 2018.

Helix QAC was used to make the C source code measurements given in the book Safer C by Les Hatton.

HeliX QAC can be used for quality assurance of C source code and checking the code for conformance to coding guidelines such as MISRA C.  Other functionality includes the ability to calculate code metrics for projects with large code-bases.

The tools operate through an integrated development environment (IDE) designed to help maintain and understand old and new code using detailed cross references and a variety of graphical views.
The tools can be used with a command line interface, and graphical IDE can be called to display the result.

See also
List of tools for static code analysis

References

External links
 
 Evaluating the relation between coding standard violations and faults within and across versions

History of computing in the United Kingdom
Static program analysis tools